Irina Viktorovna Osipova (born 25 June 1981) is a Russian basketball player. Since 2002 she was part of the Russia women's national basketball team at most major international competitions. She won Olympic bronze medals in 2004 and 2008, placing fourth in 2012, and collected three gold and five silver medals at the world and European championships. She currently plays for Dynamo Kursk from Russian Women's Basketball Premier League. She is married and has a daughter Alyona.

Career
 1997–2001  Gloria Moscow
 2001–2002  Dynamo Moscow
 2002–2004  UMMC Ekaterinburg
 2004  VBM-SGAU Samara
 2004–2005  Elitzur Ramla
 2005–2012  Spartak Moscow Region
 2012–2014  İstanbul Üniversitesi
 2014  Good Angels Košice
 2014–2016  Dynamo Kursk
 2017–2019  Spartak Moscow Region
 2006  Detroit Shock

References

Living people
1981 births
Russian women's basketball players
Detroit Shock players
Basketball players at the 2004 Summer Olympics
Basketball players at the 2008 Summer Olympics
Basketball players at the 2012 Summer Olympics
Olympic basketball players of Russia
Olympic bronze medalists for Russia
Olympic medalists in basketball
Medalists at the 2008 Summer Olympics
Medalists at the 2004 Summer Olympics